The 1995 McDonald's Championship took place at the London Arena in London, United Kingdom.

Participants

Bracket

Final standings

External links
NBA International Pre-Season and Regular-Season Games
List of champions at a-d-c

1995–96
1995–96 in American basketball
1995–96 in Israeli basketball
1995–96 in Spanish basketball
1995–96 in British basketball
1995–96 in Italian basketball
1995 in Australian basketball
International basketball competitions hosted by the United Kingdom